Markus Sammer (born 20 May 1988) is an Austrian bobsledder.

Career
Sammer competed at the 2014 Winter Olympics for Austria. He teamed with driver Benjamin Maier in the two-man event, finishing 22nd, and with Maier, Stefan Withalm, Angel Somov and Sebastian Heufler in the four-man event, finishing 21st.

As of April 2014, his best showing at the World Championships is 22nd, in the 2013 four-man event.

Sammer made his World Cup debut in November 2012. As of April 2014, his best finish is 8th in a four-man event in 2013–14 at Altenberg.

References

External links

1988 births
Living people
Olympic bobsledders of Austria
People from Kufstein
Bobsledders at the 2014 Winter Olympics
Bobsledders at the 2018 Winter Olympics
Bobsledders at the 2022 Winter Olympics
Austrian male bobsledders
Sportspeople from Tyrol (state)
21st-century Austrian people